The Mirador (2007) is a fantasy novel by Sarah Monette. It is the third book of the Doctrine of Labyrinths series, which includes Mélusine, The Virtu, and Corambis.

See also

 Doctrine of Labyrinths

External links
 Sarah Monette's official site

2007 American novels
American fantasy novels
Ace Books books